The 1898–99 Brown men's ice hockey season was the 2nd season of play for the program.

Season
While Brown continued to play most of their games on the road, the men's team did play their first game at home, hosting Harvard on the first of February. This was the last time Brown finished with a winning record until 1929.

Note: Brown University did not formally adopt the Bear as its mascot until the fall of 1905.

Roster

Standings

Schedule and Results

|-
!colspan=12 style=";" | Regular Season

References

Brown Bears men's ice hockey seasons
Brown
Brown
Brown
Brown